Flaunt It is the debut studio album by British new wave band Sigue Sigue Sputnik, released on 28 July 1986 by Parlophone. The album featured remixes of their hit singles "Love Missile F1-11" and "21st Century Boy" and peaked at number 10 on the UK Albums Chart.

Adverts
Flaunt It was unique in that the band sold spots between songs for advertisements. Ultimately, ads for L'Oréal, i-D magazine, the short-lived London pirate television station NeTWork 21, and London's Kensington Market clothing shop Pure Sex were complemented by fictitious ads for the Sputnik Corporation and the (unreleased) Sigue Sigue Sputnik Computer Game; a spoken word advertisement (narrated by the Sputnik Corporation voiceover) for EMI closes the album. All original CD versions and the version released in Germany also include an ad for Tempo, a lifestyle magazine. The liner notes include small print ads for the various advertisers, as well.

Originally, the album was going to feature eight different adverts for the UK, US and Japan releases. However, band member Tony James was unable to secure different adverts, so the releases in the US and Japan featured the same adverts as the UK version. The eight adverts lasted up to 30 seconds long and reportedly each cost $1,500. Before the album's release, James said "We could earn $150,000 before we sell a single copy. Ultimately, the profits could be used to reduce the price of records".

Release
The first 20,000 copies of Flaunt It were released in a special edition box, based on Japanese toy robot packaging, and came with a 12-page booklet.

Several singles were released from the album. Their debut single, "Love Missile F1-11" was a Top-10 hit in numerous countries, including the UK, where it peaked at number 3 on the Singles Chart, and Spain where it topped the charts. The subsequent single "21st Century Boy" did not achieve the same amount of success, however it did peaked at number 20 in the UK.

There was a lot of pressure to release "Atari Baby" as the third single. However, James refused as he wanted "Sex Bomb Boogie" released as "the third in the trilogy". Also James' idea was to release "Sex Bomb Boogie" as a video-only single in the UK, which made it ineligible to chart. The video featured footage from the James Cameron film The Terminator (1984). The single, however, was released in Germany, but failed to chart. Sigue Sigue Sputnik decided to release the double A-sided single "Rockit Miss U.S.A."/"Teenage Thunder" under the pseudonym 'Sci-Fi Sex Stars' on their short-lived label 'Who M I?'. It was a limited release of 1000 copies and featured different mixes of the two songs compared to their album versions. The final single, "Massive Retaliation", was only released in the US.

On 9 October 2020, Cherry Red Records reissued this album in a 4CD deluxe edition featuring remixes, B-sides and unreleased material, including a live performance recorded at Abbey Road Studios. The content was remastered with input from James and fellow band member Neal X.

Critical reception
The album was slated by British press and critical opinion was muted. Reviewing for Record Mirror, Roger Morton wrote that "it was a mistake to put out 'the album' at all" and that "somebody should have told Giorgio Moroder what a wild, writhing sex flash this was supposed to be, because most of it sounds pretty tame." He concluded that it "doesn't mean it's a dead horse that Tony's flaunting, but the tired old rock'n'roll nag is bound to limp a bit under the weight of all that techno-junk clutter and global domination boasting."

Reviewing for Smash Hits, Tom Hibbert wrote that "apart from one attempt at "atmospherics", "Atari Baby", the whole thing proceeds at an identical pace and similar jerky level and, once you've got the joke, it's really quite enjoyable: not as good as Adam Ant but a birrovalaff anyway – even if you do know that it'll all sound horrendously dated by this time next year."

Anthony Naughton for Number One wrote that the band "seem to be caught in a Dan Dare time warp, and regard space, violence and sex as being fundamental features in life (unlike Dan Dare)" and that "the bubble hasn't burst yet, it's just let out a little wind."

Track listing

 On download and streaming services, "Love Missile F1-11" is the 7-inch single version with a duration of 3:44.

2020 deluxe edition

Personnel
Sigue Sigue Sputnik
 Martin Degville – vocals
 Tony James – synth guitar
 Neal X – electric guitar
 Ray Mayhew – drums
 Chris Kavanagh – drums
 Miss Yana Ya Ya (Jane Farrimond) – special effects

Technical
 Giorgio Moroder – producer
 Brian Reeves – engineer
 Syd Brak – illustrations
 Mike Morton – photography
 Joe Shutter – photography
 Frank Griffin – photography
 Dave Thompson – liner notes
 Brian Carr – legal counsel

Popular culture
"Love Missile F1-11" was used in the 1986 hit film Ferris Bueller's Day Off and the 2002 video game Grand Theft Auto: Vice City. A version of the song is featured in the South Park episode Super Fun Time, with Eric Cartman singing along "I'm having a super fun time". The song also features on the trailer for Stretch (2014).

Pop Will Eat Itself released a cover of "Love Missile F1-11" as a single in May 1987, before including it on their debut studio albumBox Frenzy in 1988. David Bowie covered the song as an outtake during the sessions for his 2003 studio album, Reality. It was then released as a B-side for the single "New Killer Star".

The robot depicted on Syd Brak's cover art was ranked as the 17th best robot of all time on the January 18th, 2017 episode of The Best Show with Tom Scharpling.

Charts

References

External links
 

1986 debut albums
Sigue Sigue Sputnik albums
EMI Records albums
Albums produced by Giorgio Moroder